The Francis Wyman House is a historic house at 56 Francis Wyman Road in Burlington, Massachusetts.

Built ca. 1730, the Wyman House was added to the National Register of Historic Places in 1975.

On November 26, 1996, a fire severely burned the inside of the house.  During the summer of 2012 the house was open to the public for the first time ever.

The house was named as one of the 1,000 places to visit in Massachusetts by the Great Places in Massachusetts Commission.

See also
List of the oldest buildings in Massachusetts
National Register of Historic Places listings in Middlesex County, Massachusetts

References

External links

Francis Wyman Association Official site
LOC Website, This is a link to the Library of Congress Historical American Buildings survey. You can find (6) photos and (12) architectural drawings from the 1930s.

Houses completed in 1666
Houses on the National Register of Historic Places in Middlesex County, Massachusetts
Burlington, Massachusetts
1666 establishments in Massachusetts